The International School of Portland (I.S.P.) is an independent Chinese, Spanish and Japanese immersion elementary school in Portland, Oregon.  The International School of Portland was founded in 1990 and today educates nearly 500 students in these languages and in English. 

· It is one of only two schools in the United States – and perhaps the world – offering full immersion in three separate language tracks under one roof.

· It is home to the longest-running Chinese immersion program in the Pacific Northwest. Established in 1997 with twelve students, it is the 8th oldest program in the United States.

· It is home to the premier Japanese language program in the United States. It was the first programs in the country to offer full Japanese language immersion. It is the only program to combine Japanese immersion with the renowned International Baccalaureate approach.

The International School of Portland is an authorized International Baccalaureate (IB) school, teaching children through the IB's inquiry-based Primary Years Programme. It was the first elementary school in the Pacific Northwest to offer the International Baccalaureate Primary Years Programme (IB PYP).

The International School of Portland has been designated as an International Spanish Academy, one of only 28 American schools to earn this designation from the Ministry of Education and Science of Spain.

History
The school was founded in 1990 by Doug and Frey Stearns. The school started by offering full Spanish immersion in 1990, full Japanese immersion starting in 1995, and full Chinese immersion starting in 1996. 

In 2006, The International School of Portland expanded its campus to accommodate increased enrollment.

In 2010, the school became the first elementary school in the Pacific Northwest approved to teach the International Baccalaureate program. The campus, located on the SW Waterfront near downtown Portland, currently consists of six buildings.

In 2016, the International School of Portland was awarded 4th place in the Ministry of Spain's ISA’s Academic Excellence in Spanish Competition. The contest recognizes North American K-12 schools for excellence in the implementation of an integrated learning methodology of content and language in Spanish. the International School of Portland was the only private school recognized out of the seven elementary, middle, and high schools on the list.

References

External links
The International School of Portland

Private elementary schools in Oregon
Educational institutions established in 1990
1990 establishments in Oregon
International schools in Oregon
International Baccalaureate schools in Oregon